Darkhan ("blacksmith") is the second-largest city in Mongolia and the capital of Darkhan-Uul Aimag (Darkhan-Uul Province). It has a population of 121,428 in 2013.

History 
On October 17, 1961, the city of Darkhan was built with extensive economic assistance from the Comecon. As its name implies, the city was originally conceived to be a manufacturing site for Mongolia's northern territory. Polish specialists built a woodworking plant, brickworks and a lime factory in Darkhan. Hungarians built a meat factory, opened in 1974.

The city remains a mostly industrial centre and is the home of some 82% of Darkhan-Uul Province's population. As with most urban Mongols, some 86% of the city's population live in residential apartments, with the remaining population living in yurts (gers) on the outskirts of the city.

Geography and structures
It is a city with notable Soviet influence, evidenced by the huge square buildings and heavy Cyrillic usage. Darkhan is surrounded by mountains and hills, also having some tourist attractions like statues largely being Buddhist attractions. Some parts of the city have wooden houses.

Climate
Darkhan has a borderline humid continental climate (Dwb), close to the more typical subarctic climate (Dwc) of northern Mongolia, which is found in higher areas near the city, and only marginally wet enough to avoid qualifying as a semi-arid climate (BSk). These three climate types tend to overlap a good deal over the border regions of Mongolia, Russia and Kazakhstan. This area has extremely cold and dry winters; however the summers are warmer and more humid.

Culture 

The Kharagiin monastery is housed in a log cabin in the old town; it has recently become active again as a Buddhist monastery.

In addition, the city hosts the Museum of Darkhan-Uul. This museum, also called the Traditional Museum of Folk Art, contains a collection of archaeological findings, traditional clothing, religious artifacts, and taxidermy.

The city has a monument to the horse-head fiddle (morin khuur), the national emblematic instrument of Mongols.

Education 
Darkhan is the second largest educational center in Mongolia, making the educational level of the city's population very high. Hundreds of students come to Darkhan from other parts of Mongolia to study. Currently in Darkhan Uul Aimag there are 10 higher education institutions, 25 secondary schools, 14 kindergartens, the Institute of Management and Development, the Regional Business Development Center and the Plant Science and Agricultural Training Research Institute.

Partner cities 
Darkhan is partnered with:

References 

1961 establishments in Mongolia
Populated places established in 1961
Aimag centers
Socialist planned cities